Washwood Heath depot is a planned depot in Washwood Heath, Birmingham for High Speed 2 (HS2), a high-speed railway line under construction in the United Kingdom. Planning permission for the 14 road site was granted in early 2023.

History 
Part of the site was previously occupied by factories for LDV Group and Wolseley Motors. Manufacturing ceased in 2009.

It was also previously occupied by the Washwood Heath Railway Works, which was later used by Metro-Cammell and last used by Alstom. The land was acquired along with other properties by St. Modwen Properties from Alstom in 2002, who leased it back to companies including Alstom and Network Rail. The  was sold to the government in December 2016 for an undisclosed amount. The Railway Works was cleared in 2019.

The site was identified as the favoured location for a depot by HS2 in 2011.

In 2018, a row of houses and a motor workshop on Common Lane were compulsory purchased. In February 2021, HS2 began seeking bids for an estimated £275million contract to build the depot. In early 2023, Birmingham City Council gave planning permission to build the site.

Infrastucture 
The site is expected to have 14 sidings, a maintenance building which will cover , and network control centre (the NICC - Network Integrated Control Centre).

Usage 
The site will contain a rolling stock maintenance depot, storage area, control centre, and facilities for drivers and cleaning staff. It will be the only depot for phases 1 and 2a of the project.

References 

High Speed 2
Railway depots in England
Rail transport in Birmingham, West Midlands
Buildings and structures in Birmingham, West Midlands